East End Hustle is a 1976 drama film directed by Frank Vitale and distributed by Troma Entertainment. The plot concerns a high-priced prostitute who leads a rebellion of hookers against their sadistic pimps.

External links

1976 films
Canadian independent films
Troma Entertainment films
1976 crime drama films
Canadian crime drama films
English-language Canadian films
Films produced by Don Carmody
1976 drama films
1976 independent films
1970s English-language films
1970s Canadian films